Mahón is a municipality, capital city of Menorca, Balearic Islands, Spain, and seat of the Island Council of Menorca. 

Mahon may also refer to:

In places:
Mahon, Cork, Ireland
River Mahon, County Waterford, Ireland
Mahone Bay, Nova Scotia (town)
Mahone Bay, Nova Scotia
Mahon, Indiana, United States
Mahon, Mississippi, United States
Port Mahon, Delaware, United States
Port Mahon, Sheffield, South Yorkshire UK, Urban area of North Sheffield UK

In other uses:
Mahon (name) (includes a list of persons with the name)
Mahon Tribunal, an inquiry into political corruption in Ireland

See also 
Mahon Bridge, a village in Ireland
Mahón cheese
Mahone (disambiguation)
McMahon
MacMahon
Pennsylvania Coal Co. v. Mahon, an American Supreme Court case on regulatory taking